Air India Cargo was a cargo airline, it was the freight carrying subsidiary of Air India, based in Mumbai. It operated freighter aircraft services off and on at different stages of its history, the latest being from 2006 to 2012. Although the company has stopped operating as an airline it continues to manage the belly cargo hold capacity of Air India's passenger fleet.

History
Air India Cargo was set up in 1932, and started its freighter operations with a Douglas DC-3 aircraft, giving Air India the distinction of being the first Asian airline to operate freighters.

Between the 1980s and 1990s it operated Boeing 747 and Douglas DC-8 freighter aircraft on various international routes through other companies.

In 2006 the airline relaunched freighter services following the merger of Indian Airlines and its domestic subsidiary Alliance Air with Air India; which led to the acquisition of a single Boeing 737-200C aircraft from Alliance's fleet, plus ten additional passenger versions of the aircraft, of which five were converted to freighters. One of these was also painted in Indian Airlines' old livery for a brief period after conversion. All six aircraft were flying on Air India Cargo domestic routes.

Air India also converted four of its Airbus A310s. These were deployed on the Dammam-Frankfurt route. After ending international operations two were leased out to new cargo startup Aryan Cargo Express, while a third was sold to an African company.

In November 2007, Air India partnered with GATI for a dedicated freighter service using the 737s.

With rising competition from local cargo airlines as well as financial issues, Air India Cargo ended freighter aircraft operations in early 2012.

Destinations

Air India Cargo served the following cities with freighter aircraft until January 2012; it also had ground truck-transportation arrangements on select destinations.

India
 Telangana
 Hyderabad – Rajiv Gandhi International Airport
 Delhi
 Indira Gandhi International Airport Hub
 Goa
 Dabolim Airport
 Gujarat
 Ahmedabad – Sardar Vallabhbhai Patel International Airport
 Karnataka
 Bangalore – Kempegowda International Airport
 Kerala
 Kozhikode – Calicut International Airport
 Kochi – Cochin International Airport
 Thiruvananthapuram – Trivandrum International Airport
 Maharashtra
 Mumbai – Chhatrapati Shivaji Maharaj International Airport Hub
 Manipur
 Imphal – Imphal International Airport
 Tamil Nadu
 Chennai – Chennai International Airport Hub
 Uttar Pradesh
 Lucknow – Amausi Airport
 West Bengal
 Kolkata – Netaji Subhas Chandra Bose International Airport

International routes included Dammam and Frankfurt, some other routes were also operated.

Fleet
Air India Cargo operated the following aircraft at January 2012:

Previous aircraft operated

 Airbus A310-300F
 Boeing 747-200F
 Douglas DC-3F
 Douglas DC-8-73F

See also

 Air India
 List of airlines of India
 List of airports in India
 Transport in India
 Star Alliance

References

External links
 Official Website

Air India
Airlines established in 1932
Airlines disestablished in 2012
Cargo airlines of India
Companies based in Mumbai
Defunct airlines of India
Indian companies established in 1932
Indian companies disestablished in 2012